Janne Häkkinen (born 28 May 1984) is a Finnish orienteering and ski orienteering competitor.

He won a silver medal in the long distance at the 2013 World Ski Orienteering Championships.

References

External links

1984 births
Living people
Finnish orienteers
Ski-orienteers